Miklós Kitl (born 1 June 1997) is a Hungarian football player who plays for Békéscsaba.

Statistics

Club

Updated to games played as of 9 December 2017

References 
MLSZ

1997 births
People from Senta
Hungarians in Vojvodina
Living people
Hungarian footballers
Hungary youth international footballers
Association football midfielders
Kecskeméti TE players
Diósgyőri VTK players
Dorogi FC footballers
Békéscsaba 1912 Előre footballers
Nemzeti Bajnokság I players
Nemzeti Bajnokság II players